The first season of The Bachelorette Australia premiered on Network Ten on 23 September 2015. The season features Sam Frost, a 26-year-old Marketing Manager from Melbourne, Victoria, courting 14 men. Frost previously appeared on the second season of The Bachelor Australia, where although she won the show and received a proposal from Blake Garvey, the two separated prior to the finale airing.

Contestants
The season began with 14 contestants.

Future appearances
Richie Strahan was later chosen as the bachelor on the fourth season of The Bachelor. Michael Turnbull and Davey Lloyd returned for the inaugural series of Bachelor in Paradise. Strahan later returned for the second season of Bachelor in Paradise.

Call-out order
Color key

Episodes

Episode 1
Original airdate: 23 September 2015

Episode 2
Original airdate: 24 September 2015

Episode 3
Original airdate: 30 September 2015

Episode 4
Original airdate: 1 October 2015

Episode 5
Original airdate: 7 October 2015

Episode 6
Original airdate: 8 October 2015

Episode 7
Original airdate: 14 October 2015

Episode 8
Original airdate: 15 October 2015

Episode 9
Original airdate: 21 October 2015

Episode 10
Original airdate: 22 October 2015

Ratings

References

2015 Australian television seasons
Australian (season 01)
Television shows filmed in Australia
Television shows filmed in New Zealand